The Wizarding World of Harry Potter is a themed area at Universal Studios Hollywood theme park near Los Angeles. The area is themed to the Harry Potter media franchise, adapting elements from the film series and novels by J.K. Rowling. The attraction—the second Harry Potter-themed area to exist at a Universal resort—was designed by Universal Creative from an exclusive license with Warner Bros. Entertainment.

After the successful debut of a similarly themed area at Universal Orlando Resort, Universal Parks & Resorts announced the construction of a second Wizarding World of Harry Potter on December 6, 2011. The Wizarding World of Harry Potter at Universal Studios Hollywood officially began operation on April 7, 2016.

This attraction suspended operations on March 14, 2020 on grounds of the COVID-19 pandemic.

Background

Previous Universal Harry Potter attractions
A Harry Potter themed attraction at a Universal Studios park or a Disney park was rumored in 2003. However, the rights to the Harry Potter franchise had been acquired by Warner Bros., which denied all rumors. In January 2007, About.com reported a rumor from a "highly credible source" that the Universal's Islands of Adventure park's Lost Continent area at Universal Orlando Resort was going to be re-themed "to the stories and characters of one of the most popular children's franchises". Other sources followed up in the next few days with unofficial confirmation that the new area would involve Harry Potter. On May 31, 2007, Universal, in partnership with Warner Bros., officially announced that the Wizarding World of Harry Potter would be added to Islands of Adventure.

After a -year construction period, the area officially opened to the public on June 18, 2010. This resulted in attendance at the park jumping approximately 50% in its first year of operation. On July 8, 2014, Universal opened an expansion to the Wizarding World at Universal Studios Florida, Diagon Alley, which was placed in the former Amity Island area of the park. This expansion also included the new ride experience: The Hogwarts Express, in which a train travels between the two Universal Florida Parks, from the Hogsmeade area to Kings Cross Station (right outside of the entrance to Diagon Alley). A week later, on July 15, 2014, Universal opened the Wizarding World of Harry Potter at Universal Studios Japan.

Rumors and official announcement
On December 1, 2011, the Wall Street Journal reported a rumor from "people familiar with the matter" that Universal Studios Hollywood was going to add its version of Islands of Adventure's Wizarding World of Harry Potter. The report also detailed the possibility that Universal Parks & Resorts would open additional Harry Potter-themed areas at Universal Studios Singapore and Universal Studios Japan as well as a location in Spain. This report was widely relayed by other media sources. On December 6, 2011, Universal Studios Hollywood announced the Wizarding World of Harry Potter. Universal Parks & Resorts executives Tom Williams and Ron Meyer were accompanied by Warner Bros. executives, the Governor of California Jerry Brown as well as James and Oliver Phelps who played the Weasley twins in the films. The announcement came with very few details of what would be built, however, it did confirm that the Gibson Amphitheatre would be demolished and a re-creation of Hogwarts and Harry Potter and the Forbidden Journey would be constructed. The last show at the Gibson Amphitheatre was held on September 6, 2013, prior to its closure and subsequent demolition.

On April 23, 2013, NBCUniversal made the final step by receiving a unanimous vote in approval of the 25-year expansion by the county Board of Supervisors. This $1.6 billion expansion is expected to greatly boost tourism and the local entertainment industry. It will also create 30,000 jobs during the time of construction.

On December 8, 2015, it was announced that the park will open on April 7, 2016. The announcement featured actress Evanna Lynch, who played Luna Lovegood in the Harry Potter films. However, the soft opening was on March 31, 2016.

Attractions
Similar to the Wizarding World in Japan, this one never featured the Dragon Challenge coaster like Islands of Adventure once had, but does include Harry Potter and the Forbidden Journey and Flight of the Hippogriff, along with Ollivander's Wand Shop Show, and the Frog Choir and Triwizard Spirit Rally.

Wands purchased from Ollivander's Wand Shop can be used to do "magic", using sensors that track down the wands. While performing different "spells" from the Harry Potter universe, fans can produce different reactions, such as unlocking a cabinet, opening a box of candy (Chocolate Frogs), and forcing a ruler to lower itself.

The table below show the different attractions across the park.

Dining and shopping
The Three Broomsticks and Hog's Head Pub
Ollivander's Wand Shop
Owl Post
Wiseacre's Wizarding Equipment
Gladrags Wizardwear
Dervish and Banges
Filch's Emporium of Confiscated Goods
Honeydukes 
Zonko's

See also
The Wizarding World of Harry Potter
 The Wizarding World of Harry Potter (Universal Orlando Resort)
 The Wizarding World of Harry Potter (Universal Studios Japan)

References

External links
 

Harry Potter in amusement parks
Licensed properties at Universal Parks & Resorts
2016 establishments in California